Aalavattam is a 1993 Indian Malayalam film, directed by Raju Ambaran and starring Nedumudi Venu and Shanthi Krishna in the lead roles.

Plot 
Kesavankutty, known as Meppaattupurakkal Kesavankutty is very famous for his ancestors and their family status. They have been running the festivals in the temple for many years. His wife Urmila is a good housewife, caring about him and his family a lot. He has a grandmother and a sister Usha. They have a glass factory as an asset. Kesavankutty takes money for high interest and pays the expenses of the company and temple. Meanwhile, Usha gets a marriage proposal from a Doctor, Narayanankutty. Actually they approached on with the dream of Dowry. Usha and Doctor gets close via calls and meets. After meeting the Doctor's family Kesavankutty finds them as very greedy. He tries to pull back Usha, but he fails. The Doctor convinces her that her brother is not willing because he doesn't wish to give money. He is very miserly.

At the same time in the company, the employees go for a strike, demanding a hike in salary and a bonus. And also the people who gave money on interest harass him. This time his grandmother passes away. He feels alone in life. In the centre of all these tension, Usha goes to the Doctor's quarters. But she realises the real face of him. And gets off from there. Govindankutty, Balu and Harikrishnan, who were really close to Kesavankutty scolds her and brings her back to her home. And also they plan to get funds from Dubai friends of Govindankutty as an investment in the factory for dividends and to help the factory's financial trouble. Thus all his problems are solved. The movie ends with the happy note of Urmila being pregnant and a happy Kesavankutty who yearned for child.

Cast
Nedumudi Venu as Keshavan Nair
Sukumari Maalu amma
Innocent as Vareeth
KPAC Lalitha as Savithri Amma
Prem Kumar as Govindankutty 
Sankaradi as Madhavan Maman
Sreenivasan as Balu
Ilavarasi as Usha	
Poojappura Ravi as Bhasi Pillai Driver
Shanthi Krishna as Urmila
T. P. Madhavan as Manager Pappachan
Devan as Dr Narayankutty
Kollam Thulasi as Thankappan Pillai

Soundtrack
"Rithu gaanam" - Anitha
"Naamavum Roopavum" - S Janaki, Chorus
"Peraarin Panineer" - KS Chithra	Kaithapram
"Mandana Chandrike" - G Venugopal	Kaithapram
"Paadaam Panimazhayaruliya" - G Venugopal

References

External links
 

1993 films
1990s Malayalam-language films
Films scored by Mohan Sithara